Viçosa is a Brazilian municipality in Alagoas state. Located inland on the zone of a former portion of the Atlantic Rain Forest, it is 86 km away from the state capital Maceio. Its population was 25,693 (2020) and its area is 354.76 km².

References

Municipalities in Alagoas